Tarakab or Tarkab may refer to:
 Tarakab, Bagh-e Malek
 Tarakab, Izeh